Saša Janaćković (born 13 August 1988) is a Serbian football defender.

References

External links
 
 Saša Janaćković stats at utakmica.rs
 Saša Janaćković stats at footballdatabase.eu

1988 births
Living people
Association football defenders
Serbian footballers
FK Kolubara players
FK Zemun players
FK Čukarički players
FK Veternik players
FK Metalac Gornji Milanovac players
Serbian SuperLiga players
FK Berane players
Montenegrin First League players